Proteinase-activated receptor 1 (PAR1) also known as protease-activated receptor 1 or coagulation factor II (thrombin) receptor is a protein that in humans is encoded by the F2R gene. PAR1 is a G protein-coupled receptor and one of four protease-activated receptors involved in the regulation of thrombotic response. Highly expressed in platelets and endothelial cells, PAR1 plays a key role in mediating the interplay between coagulation and inflammation, which is important in the pathogenesis of inflammatory and fibrotic lung diseases. It is also involved both in disruption and maintenance of endothelial barrier integrity, through interaction with either thrombin or activated protein C, respectively.

Structure 
PAR1 is a transmembrane G-protein-coupled receptor (GPCR) that shares much of its structure with the other protease-activated receptors. These characteristics include having seven transmembrane alpha helices, four extracellular loops and three intracellular loops. PAR1 specifically contains 425 amino acid residues arranged for optimal binding of thrombin at its extracellular N-terminus. The C-terminus of PAR1 is located on the intracellular side of the cell membrane as part of its cytoplasmic tail.

Signal transduction pathway

Activation 
PAR1 is activated when the terminal 41 amino acids of its N-terminus are cleaved by thrombin, a serine protease. Thrombin recognizes PAR1 by a Lysine-Aspartate-Proline-Arginine-Serine sequence at the N-terminal, where it cuts the peptide bond between Arginine-41 and Serine-42. The affinity of thrombin to this specific cleavage site in PAR1 is further aided by secondary interactions between thrombin's exosite and an acidic region of amino acid residues located C-terminal to Ser-42. This proteolytic cleavage is irreversible and the loose peptide, often referred to as parstatin, is then released outside of the cell. The newly revealed N-terminus acts as a tethered ligand that binds to a binding region between extracellular loops 3 and 4 of PAR1, therefore activating the protein. The binding instigates conformational changes in the protein that ultimately allow for the binding of G-proteins to sites on the intracellular region of PAR1.

Signalling 
Once cleaved, PAR1 can activate G-proteins that bind to several locations on its intracellular loops. For example, PAR1 in conjunction with PAR4 can couple to and activate G-protein G12/13 which in turn activates Rho and Rho kinase. This pathway leads to the quick alteration of platelet shape due to actin contractions that lead to platelet mobility, as well as the release of granules which are both necessary for platelet aggregation. Coupling can also occur with Gq, leading to phospholipase C-β activation; this pathway results in the stimulation of protein kinase C (PKC) which impacts platelet activation.

Additionally, both PAR1 and PAR4 can couple to G-protein q which stimulates intracellular movement for Calcium ions that serve as second messengers for platelet activation. This also activates protein kinase C which stimulates platelet aggregation and therefore blood coagulation further down the pathway.

Termination 
The phosphorylation of PAR1's cytoplasmic tail and subsequent binding to arrestin uncouples the protein from G protein signaling. These phosphorylated PAR1s are transported back into the cell via endosomes where they are sent to Golgi bodies. The cleaved PAR1s are then sorted and transported to lysosomes where they are degraded. This internalization and degradation process is necessary for the termination of receptor signaling.

In order to regain thrombin responsiveness, PAR1 must be replenished in the cell surface. Uncleaved PAR1 in the cell membrane gets bound by the AP2 adaptor complex at a tyrosine motif on the intracellular C-terminus, which stimulates the endocytosis of the unactivated PAR1. It is then stored in clathrin-coated vesicles within the cytosol and ultimately protected from proteolysis. This ensures that there is a constant supply of uncleaved PAR1 that can be cycled into the plasma membrane independent of PAR1 reproduction, thus resensitizing the cell to thrombin and resetting the signal transduction pathway.

Ligands

Agonists 
Finding selective agonists for PAR1 has also been a topic of interest for researchers. A synthetic SFLLRN peptide has been found to serve as an agonist for PAR1. The SFLLRN peptide mimics the first six residues of the N-terminal tethered ligand of activated PAR1 and binds to the same binding site on the second extracellular loop. So, even in the absence of thrombin, SFLLRN binding can garner a response from cleaved or uncleaved PAR1.

Antagonists 
Selective antagonists for the PAR1 receptor have been developed for use as anti-clotting agents. 

 SCH-79797
 Vorapaxar, sold under the brand name Zontivity, is a first-in-class anti-platelet drug used in the treatment of heart disease in patients with a history of heart attacks and peripheral artery disease. Vorapaxar has been recently shown to attenuate the neutrophilic inflammatory response to Streptococcus pneumoniae by reducing levels of pro-inflammatory cytokines such as IL-1β and chemokines CXCL1, CCL2 and CCL7. PAR1 is inhibited by Vorapaxar when the molecule binds to a binding pocket between extracellular loop 2 and 3 of the PAR1 where it stabilizes the inactivated protein structure and prevents the switch to the active conformation.

See also 
 Protease-activated receptor

References

Further reading

External links 
 

Receptors
G protein-coupled receptors